Kumharon Ka Bass is a village situated about  away from Surajgarh in the Jhunjhunu district of Rajasthan in India. Since 1938 all villagers have belonged to the same caste and are all related. The Jalam, Birbalram and Nanak Jalindra came from Damoli and Berla, singhania (rajyora), kithania (bhatiwal), pichanawa (khatiwal), kakodia (manithia) are a part of Shekhawati region. They belong to the general [unreserved category]. 

It has a population of around 1500 and nearly 80% of the people have the surname Kumawat, also known as Prajapat. Many of the villagers are farmers and many of the young people are serving in the Indian Army, the Airforce, as teachers or at masons. Many work in Jhunjhunu district or in foreign countries like Qatar, Oman, the United Arab Emirates, and Saudi Arabia.

The young children are involved in education through a government school in the village.

Villages in Jhunjhunu district